House o'Hill Halt railway station served the area of House o Hill, Edinburgh, Scotland, from 1937 to 1951 on the Barnton Branch.

History 
The station was opened on 1 February 1937 by the London, Midland and Scottish Railway. The suffix 'halt' was dropped from its name in Bradshaw in 1937. It closed on 7 May 1951.

References 

Disused railway stations in Edinburgh
Former London, Midland and Scottish Railway stations
Railway stations in Great Britain opened in 1937
Railway stations in Great Britain closed in 1951
1937 establishments in Scotland
1951 disestablishments in Scotland